A Yellow Bird is a 2016 Singaporean-French drama film directed and co-written by K. Rajagopal and starring Sivakumar Palakrishnan, Huang Lu, and Seema Biswas. It was screened in the International Critics' Week section at the 2016 Cannes Film Festival.

Plot 
Siva (Sivakumar Palakrishnan) a Singaporean-Indian man is released after in prison for contraband smuggling. Unable to find forgiveness from his mother, he begins a quest to locate his ex-wife and daughter. Just as he finds solace and hope in the company of an illegal Chinese prostitute (Huang Lu), he is confronted with an unbearable truth about his family. How far he will go in order to redeem himself from guilt?

Cast 
 Sivakumar Palakrishnan as Siva
 Huang Lu
 Seema Biswas as Siva's mother
 Udaya Soundari as Pavani
 Nithiyia Rao
 Indra Chandran

References

External links 
 

2016 films
2016 drama films
2010s Tamil-language films
2010s Mandarin-language films
2010s English-language films
Singaporean drama films
French drama films
Films directed by K. Rajagopal
2016 directorial debut films
2016 multilingual films
Singaporean multilingual films
French multilingual films
2010s French films